The 2016–17 Weber State Wildcats women's basketball team represents Weber State University during the 2016–17 NCAA Division I women's basketball season. The Wildcats are led by fifth year head coach Bethann Ord and play their home games at the Dee Events Center. They were members of the Big Sky Conference. They finished the season 13–18, 6–12 in Big Sky play to finish in a tie for eighth place. They advanced to the quarterfinals of the Big Sky women's tournament where they lost to Montana State.

Radio Broadcasts
All Wildcats games will be heard on KWCR with Nick Bailey calling the action. All home games and conference road games will also be streamed with video live online through Watch Big Sky.

Roster

Schedule

|-
!colspan=9 style="background:#4B2187; color:#FFFFFF;"| Exhibition

|-
!colspan=8 style="background:#4B2187; color:#FFFFFF;"| Non-conference regular season

|-
!colspan=8 style="background:#4B2187; color:#FFFFFF;"| Big Sky regular season

|-
!colspan=9 style="background:#4B2187;"| Big Sky Women's Tournament

See also
2016–17 Weber State Wildcats men's basketball team

References

Weber State Wildcats women's basketball seasons
Weber State